The shrub Cnestis ferruginea is native to Africa. It is best known for its uses in herbal medicine.

Medicinal uses
The tart, astringent fruit is chewed for oral hygiene. Extracts from the fruit have been found to have antimicrobial effects, especially against gram-positive bacteria.

References

Further reading
 Olugbade T.A., J.O. Oluwadiya, and W.A. Yisak. (1982). Chemical constituents of Cnestis ferruginea DC. I. Petroleum ether fraction. Journal of Ethnopharmacology 6(3):365-70

External links

Connaraceae
Medicinal plants of Africa